The Type 73 is an artillery tractor of the Japan Ground Self-Defense Force.

History
The first production of the Type 73 was in 1974, built by Hitachi as a domestic replacement for the American M4 and M8 high-speed tractors. It was never produced in large numbers, as self-propelled artillery became the new focus.

Construction
The cab and gun crew compartments of the Type 73 are fully enclosed steel, with ammunition carried in a separate compartment at the rear. A 400 hp Mitsubishi diesel engine powers full tracks, and armament is a single 12.7mm anti-aircraft machine gun.

Usage
The Type 73 was intended to tow weapons such as the 155 mm Long Tom gun and the M115 203 mm howitzer. It can also be fitted with a dozer blade, or alternatively, the Type 92 mine roller.

Further reading 
 

Artillery tractors
Japan Ground Self-Defense Force
Cold War military equipment of Japan